Maurice Bernachon (born in Saint-André-le-Gaz, July 1919; died in Lyon in the night from 17 to 18 September 1999) was a master chocolatier and founder of the Bernachon family business.

Biography 
The son of a signalman, Bernachon started an apprenticeship as pâtissier in Pont-de-Beauvoisin at 12 years of age. In 1975 he created the Président, a cake creation to celebrate the admission to the French League of Honor of Paul Bocuse by then-president of France Valéry Giscard d'Estainga cake that made him famous.

He was one of the few French chocolatiers who would entirely manufacture their own chocolate from raw cocoa, imported variously from Venezuela, Colombia, Brazil and Equatorial Guinea.

He retired in 1997, leaving the management of his chocolate business to his son Jean-Jacques (1944-2010), husband to Françoise, the daughter of Paul Bocuse.

The business is currently run by Philippe and Stéphanie Bernachon, the children of Françoise and Jean-Jacques.

Bibliography 
Bernachon, Maurice & Bernachon, Jean-Jacques (1985) La passion du chocolat. Flammarion. 117 pages. Google books identifier e9z2AAAACAAJ. Accessed on 10 August 2014.
Deligeorges, Stéphane (2009) Le chocolat selon Bernachon. Glénat. 246 pages. Google books identifier tniQgAACAAJ. . Accessed on 10 August 2014.

References 

Chocolatiers